David Velay (born 15 December 1963) is a French former racing driver.

References

1963 births
Living people
French racing drivers
French Formula Three Championship drivers
International Formula 3000 drivers
FIA GT Championship drivers
Place of birth missing (living people)